Lahargin (also Romanized as Lahargīn and Lahrgīn; also known as Laharjīn and Lakhargin) is a village in Qareh Poshtelu-e Pain Rural District, Qareh Poshtelu District, Zanjan County, Zanjan Province, Iran. At the 2006 census, its population was 62, in 13 families.

References 

Populated places in Zanjan County